is a former Japanese football player.

Club career
Aoki was born in Omihachiman on April 27, 1987. After graduating from high school, he joined JEF United Chiba in 2006. From 2007, he played many matches. However he lost his opportunity to play in 2009 and he moved to Fagiano Okayama in June 2009. At Okayama, he became a regular player. He returned to JEF United in 2010 and played until 2011. Through Ventforet Kofu in 2012, he moved to Thespakusatsu Gunma in 2013. Although he played many matches in 2 seasons, he retired at the end the of 2014 season.

National team career
In July 2007, Aoki was elected Japan U-20 national team for the 2007 U-20 World Cup. At this tournament, he played all 4 matches.

Club statistics

National team statistics

Appearances in major competitions

References

External links

1987 births
Living people
Association football people from Shiga Prefecture
Japanese footballers
Japan youth international footballers
J1 League players
J2 League players
JEF United Chiba players
Fagiano Okayama players
Ventforet Kofu players
Thespakusatsu Gunma players
Association football forwards